Perry Roth is an American baseball coach and former player, who is the current hitting coach of the Charleston RiverDogs. He played college baseball at Greenville. He served as the interim head coach of the UAB Blazers (2021).

Coaching career
Roth began his coaching career as an assistant coach with his alma mater, Greenville. He then became the head coach of the Calvary Academy in Springfield, Illinois. In the fall of 1999, Roth joined the staff of Jeff Stewart at Illinois State from 2000 to 2002 where he worked with the Redbird hitters and outfielders. In the fall of 2002, he joined the staff of Brian Shoop at Birmingham–Southern, where he worked the Panther hitters, but he then left after a single year to join Dewey Kalmer's staff at Bradley. He returned to Birmingham–Southern in the summer of 2004. When Shoop was hired as the head baseball coach for the UAB Blazers, he brought Roth with him to continue instructing hitters and outfielders. On May 13, 2020, Roth was named the interim head baseball coach of the Blazers for the 2021 season, following the retirement of Shoop.

After taking the Director of Player Development role with the LSU Tigers, Roth was quickly hired away by the Tampa Bay Rays organization, where they named him the hitting coach of the Charleston RiverDogs.

Head coaching record

References

External links
UAB Blazers bio

Year of birth missing (living people)
Living people
Greenville Panthers baseball players
High school baseball coaches in the United States
Greenville Panthers baseball coaches
Illinois State Redbirds baseball coaches
Birmingham–Southern Panthers baseball coaches
Bradley Braves baseball coaches
UAB Blazers baseball coaches